The Khanate of Kalat was a Khanate that existed from 1512 to 1955 in the centre of the modern-day province of Balochistan, Pakistan. Prior to that they were subjects of Mughal King  Akbar. Mehrab Khan II Ahmedzai ruled the state independently until 1839, when he was killed by the British and Kalat became a self-governing state in a subsidiary alliance with British India. After the signature of the Treaty of Kalat by the Khan of Kalat and the Baloch Sardars in 1875, the supervision of Kalat was the task  of the Baluchistan Agency. Kalat was briefly independent again from 12 August 1947 until 27 March 1948, when its ruler Ahmad Yar Khan acceded to Pakistan, making it one of the Princely states of Pakistan.

Khanate of Kalat failed to survive through the colonial era and did not lead to the standardization of the Baloch language.

Origin 
The Khans of Kalat were Brahuis.

History

Background 
 
The Khanate of Kalat had no imperial interests and was an economically poor state, but was however, quite formidable. In 12th century, Minhaj-i-Siraj mentions of the area in the eastern part of Seistan, which bore the name, Gumbaz-i-Baluch (Dome of the Baluch). This dome was the border of the Kalat-emirs (Tabakat-i-Nasiri). The Paratarajas Kingdom was founded here before the Islamic era. According to Tarikh-i Harat and Tarikh-i Sistan, a major uprising of the Baloch tribes took place in south Afghanistan, which was destroyed by the Abbasid Caliph al-Mahdi.

In the 12th and 13th century, Tarikh-i-Masumi records the presence of Balochis during the reign of Muhammad Tughlaq (1326–1327). According to Ta'rikh-i Ihya' al-Muluk, at the end of the 16th century, the Kalat region (former Turan) was under the control of the Safavids. But at the beginning of the 17th century, the Baluch tribe of Lashari stood up against the Sistan Khan and the Kermanian Beglar-Begi, and took control of Turan and Makran, until the Kalat Khanate appeared.

Establishment 
The Khanate of Kalat was founded in 1666 by Mir Ahmad Khan. Soon after, a Mughal force fled Kandahar and occupied Quetta, Mastung, and Mangocher. In 1667, this force was decisively defeated in the Quetta valley and the khanate managed to regain the occupied districts along with Chagai. Samandar Khan was summoned to Multan by the Mughals and Kerman by the Safavids. The Mughal prince paid tribute to Samandar Khan whereas Safavid Beglar Begi presented Samandar Khan with a robe of gold, and paid tribute. The Khanate reached its peak during the reign of Khan Mir Noori Naseer Khan in 1758, who had unified the Kalat region. During this period, the Kalat was under the Suzerainty of the Durrani Empire, and did not achieve Independence until 1818.

Leasing of territories to the British 

The territories controlled by the state fluctuated over the centuries, but eventually were established by treaties with the British Agent Robert Sandeman in the late 19th century. Parts of the state to the north and northeast were leased or ceded to form the province of British Baluchistan, which later gained the status of a Chief Commissioners province.

Accession 

With the withdrawal of the British from the Indian subcontinent in 1947, the Indian Independence Act provided that the princely states which had existed alongside but outside British India were released from all their subsidiary alliances and other treaty obligations. The rulers were left to decide whether to accede to one of the newly independent states of India or Pakistan (both formed initially from the British possessions) or to remain independent outside both. As stated by Sardar Patel, "On the lapse of Paramountcy every Indian State became a separate independent entity."

The Instruments of Accession made available for the rulers to sign transferred only limited powers, namely external relations, defence, and communications.

The Shahi Jirga of Baluchistan and the non-official members of the Quetta Municipality, according to Pervaiz Iqbal Cheema, stated their wish to join Pakistan on 29 June 1947; however, according to the political scientist Rafi Sheikh, the Shahi Jirga was stripped of its members from the Kalat State prior to the vote.

Kalat remained fully independent from 15 August 1947 until 27 March 1948, when its ruler, Ahmad Yar Khan (1904–1979), finally acceded to Pakistan, becoming the last of the rulers to do so. Show elections were held during this period and a bicameral parliament was established.

On the night of 27 March, All India Radio carried a story about Yar Khan approaching India with an unsuccessful request for accession in around February. The next morning, Yar Khan put out a public broadcast rejecting its veracity and declaring an immediate accession to Pakistan — all remaining differences were to be placed before Jinnah, whose decision would be binding.

Geography 

The Khanate of Kalat occupied the central part of the territory of modern-day Balochistan province in Pakistan. To the north was Baluchistan (Chief Commissioner's Province).

The drainage of the country is almost all carried off to the south by the Nari, Mula, Hab, Porali, Hingol and Dasht rivers. The only large river draining northwards is the Rakhshan. The coast line includes Gawadar, Pasni, Sonmiani and Geewani, modern-day Pakistani Balochistan.

Subdivisions 
 Jhalawan, an ethnic Brahui subdivision, headed by the chief nawab of the Zarakzai tribe, known as Chief of Jhalawan
 Kacchi, an ethnic Sindhi subdivision, in which various tribes had their own tribal lands under the Khan of Kalat
 Sarawan, an ethnic Baloch subdivision, headed by chief nawab of Raisani tribe, called chief of Sarawan

Dushka H Saiyid emphasizes that Yar Khan lost all of his bargaining chips with the accession of Kharan, Las Bela, and Mekran leaving Kalat as an island. Salman Rafi Sheikh largely concurs with Saiyid's assessment: multiple other Kalat sardars were preparing to accede to Pakistan and Yar Khan would have hardly any territory left, if he did not accede.

On 3 October 1952, the state of Kalat entered into the Baluchistan States Union with three neighbouring states, Kharan, Las Bela, and Makran, with Yar Khan of Kalat at the head of the Union with the title of Khan-e-Azam. The Khanate came to an end on 14 October 1955, when it was incorporated into West Pakistan.

Rulers of Kalat 

The rulers of Kalat at first held the title of Wali but in 1739 also took the title of (Begler Begi Khan), usually shortened to Khan. The last Khan of Kalat had the privilege of being the President of the Council of Rulers for the Baluchistan States Union. They also had the title of beylerbey.

See also 
 Baluchistan (Chief Commissioner's Province)
 Makran (princely state)
 Las Bela (princely state)
 Kharan (princely state)
 Kalat State National Party
 List of princely states of British India

Notes

References

Further reading

External links 
 Swidler, N. (1972) "The Development of the Kalat Khanate" Journal of Asian and African Studies 7:  pp. 115–21
 Swidler, N. (1992). Kalat: The Political Economy of a Tribal Chiefdom. American Ethnologist, 19(3), 553–570
 Kalat District – Planning and Development Department of Balochistan Government
 Genealogy of the Khans of Kalat

 
States and territories disestablished in 1955
1666 establishments in Asia
1955 disestablishments in Pakistan
Former subdivisions of Pakistan